Neocleobis is a monotypic genus of ammotrechid camel spiders, first described by Carl Friedrich Roewer in 1934. Its single species, Neocleobis solitarius is distributed in Galápagos Islands.

References 

Solifugae
Arachnid genera
Monotypic arachnid genera